On Sunday, May 17, 1998, David Wells of the New York Yankees pitched the 15th perfect game in Major League Baseball history and the second in team history. Pitching against the Minnesota Twins at Yankee Stadium in The Bronx in front of 49,820 fans in attendance, Wells retired all 27 batters he faced. The game took 2 hours and 40 minutes to complete, from 1:36 PM ET to 4:16 PM ET. Wells claimed in a 2001 interview with Bryant Gumbel on HBO's Real Sports that he threw the perfect game while being hung over, calling it a "raging, skull-rattling" hangover. Jimmy Fallon claimed in a 2018 interview with Seth Meyers that he and Wells had attended a Saturday Night Live after-party until 5:30 A.M. the morning of the game. In an interview, Wells also mentioned having partied with Jimmy Fallon and Seth Meyers the night before. However, there was no new episode of Saturday Night Live the previous night, as the season finale had aired the week prior; additionally, Fallon wouldn't join the cast of Saturday Night Live until that fall while Meyers wouldn't join until 2001.

Wells' perfect game was the 245th no-hitter in MLB history and the tenth no-hitter in Yankees history. It was the first regular-season perfect game pitched by a Yankee; the franchise's previous perfect game was thrown by Don Larsen during the 1956 World Series. By coincidence, Wells graduated from the same high school as Larsen - Point Loma High School in San Diego, California. The previous perfect game in MLB history was nearly four years prior, when Kenny Rogers of the Texas Rangers pitched a perfect game against the California Angels at The Ballpark In Arlington on July 28, 1994.

Wells' perfect game was the first Yankee no-hitter since Dwight Gooden's against the Seattle Mariners in May 1996. Wells' performance tied the record for franchises with most perfect games. At the time, the Cleveland Indians were the only other team to have two perfect games; David Cone added a third perfect game to Yankees history, breaking the record in July 1999.

Three months later, on September 1, Wells took a perfect game into the seventh inning in a game against the Oakland Athletics, but he gave up a two-out single to Jason Giambi to end his bid for an unprecedented second perfect game. Wells ended up with a two-hit shutout as the Yankees won the game, 7-0.

Game statistics
May 17, Yankee Stadium, New York, New York

Box score

BATTING
Team RISP: 0-for-0.
Team LOB: 0.

FIELDING
PB: Valentin, J (4).

BATTING
2B: Williams, B 2 (11, Hawkins).
3B: Strawberry (2, Hawkins).
HR: Williams, B (3, 4th inning off Hawkins, 0 on, 2 out).
TB: Williams, B 8; Strawberry 3; Jeter; Curtis.
RBI: Strawberry (19); Williams, B (19); Curtis (24).
2-out RBI: Williams, B.
Team RISP: 2-for-8.
Team LOB: 3.

BASERUNNING
SB: Jeter (10, 2nd base off Hawkins/Valentin); Curtis (6, 2nd base off Hawkins/Valentin).

Other info
WP: Wells (5).
Pitches-strikes: Hawkins 123-84; Naulty 7-3; Swindell 12-8; Wells 120-79.
Groundouts-flyouts: Hawkins 5-11; Naulty 0-1; Swindell 0-1; Wells 6-10.
Batters faced: Hawkins 27; Naulty 2; Swindell 2; Wells 27.
Umpires: HP: Tim McClelland; 1B: John Hirschbeck; 2B: Rich Garcia; 3B: Mike Reilly.
Weather: , cloudy.
Wind: 8 mph, left to right.
Time: 2:40.
Attendance: 49,820.
Venue: Yankee Stadium.

See also

 List of Major League Baseball perfect games
 List of Major League Baseball no-hitters

References

External links
 5/17/98: David Wells' Perfect Game (via MLBClassics' YouTube channel)

1998 Major League Baseball season
Wells
New York Yankees
Minnesota Twins
May 1998 sports events in the United States
1998 in sports in New York City
1990s in the Bronx